Lake Nacimiento is a census-designated place (CDP) in northern San Luis Obispo County, California, United States.

The population of Lake Nacimiento was 2,956 at the 2020 census, up from 2,411 at the 2010 census.

Geography
The community of Lake Nacimiento is located at Lake Nacimiento reservoir, in the Santa Lucia Mountains, at  (35.737585, -120.881328).

The lake is often referred to as Dragon Lake, due to its unusual but distinct shape.

Climate
The Köppen Climate Classification subtype for this climate is "Csb" (Mediterranean Climate).

Demographics

2010
The 2010 United States Census reported that Lake Nacimiento had a population of 2,411. The racial makeup of Lake Nacimiento was 2,153 (89.3%) White, 12 (0.5%) African American, 44 (1.8%) Native American, 24 (1.0%) Asian, 5 (0.2%) Pacific Islander, 75 (3.1%) from other races, and 98 (4.1%) from two or more races. Hispanic or Latino of any race were 256 persons (10.6%).

The Census reported that 2,411 people (100% of the population) lived in households, 0 (0%) lived in non-institutionalized group quarters, and 0 (0%) were institutionalized.

There were 1,006 households, out of which 272 (27.0%) had children under the age of 18 living in them, 581 (57.8%) were opposite-sex married couples living together, 67 (6.7%) had a female householder with no husband present, 45 (4.5%) had a male householder with no wife present.  There were 66 (6.6%) unmarried opposite-sex partnerships, and 11 (1.1%) same-sex married couples or partnerships. 237 households (23.6%) were made up of individuals, and 69 (6.9%) had someone living alone who was 65 years of age or older. The average household size was 2.40.  There were 693 families (68.9% of all households); the average family size was 2.83.

The population was spread out, with 489 people (20.3%) under the age of 18, 163 people (6.8%) aged 18 to 24, 549 people (22.8%) aged 25 to 44, 865 people (35.9%) aged 45 to 64, and 345 people (14.3%) who were 65 years of age or older.  The median age was 45.1 years. For every 100 females there were 104.0 males.  For every 100 females age 18 and over, there were 103.0 males.

The homeowner vacancy rate was 3.8%; the rental vacancy rate was 6.0%.  1,784 people (74.0% of the population) lived in owner-occupied housing units and 627 people (26.0%) lived in rental housing units.

2000
As of the census of 2000, there were 2,176 people, 904 households, and 676 families residing in the CDP. The racial makeup of the CDP was 93.52% White, 0.32% African American, 1.33% Native American, 0.37% Asian, 1.06% from other races, and 3.40% from two or more races. Hispanic or Latino of any race were 7.31% of the population.

There were 904 households, out of which 26.9% had children under the age of 18 living with them, 64.6% were married couples living together, 6.2% had a female householder with no husband present, and 25.2% were non-families. 19.1% of all households were made up of individuals, and 6.1% had someone living alone who was 65 years of age or older.  The average household size was 2.41 and the average family size was 2.74.

In the CDP the population was spread out, with 21.6% under the age of 18, 4.9% from 18 to 24, 26.3% from 25 to 44, 29.8% from 45 to 64, and 17.4% who were 65 years of age or older.  The median age was 43 years. For every 100 females there were 102.6 males.  For every 100 females age 18 and over, there were 103.1 males.

The median income for a household in the CDP was $54,958, and the median income for a family was $57,206. Males had a median income of $41,447 versus $34,219 for females. The per capita income for the CDP was $22,798.  About 2.6% of families and 4.7% of the population were below the poverty line, including 3.9% of those under age 18 and 13.0% of those age 65 or over.

Government

References

Census-designated places in San Luis Obispo County, California
Santa Lucia Range